Carl Joseph Ally (31 March 1924 – 15 February 1999) was an American advertising executive who founded Ally & Gargano.

He was inducted in the American Advertising Federation Hall of Fame.

References

External links

1924 births
1999 deaths
American advertising executives